Newcastle Emlyn A.F.C. are a football team. They had been due to play in Central Wales League Southern Division for the 2022–23 season but withdrew ahead of the season in July 2022. They are from the town of Newcastle Emlyn.

The club has previously played in the Welsh Football League and was one of the founder members of the Ceredigion League.

Honours

Emrys Morgan Cup – Winners: 2017–18

References

External links
Official website

Football clubs in Wales
Sport in Carmarthenshire
Ceredigion League clubs
Welsh Football League clubs
Mid Wales Football League clubs